Deep Purple Tribute is the second live album by Serbian hard rock band Cactus Jack, recorded as a tribute album to British hard rock band Deep Purple and released in 2003. The album was released on two discs featuring 12 covers of Deep Purple songs.

The album was recorded on Cactus Jack concert held on 22 November 2002 in Coupe club in their hometown Pančevo. Deep Purple Tribute was the band's first album to feature keyboardist Zoran Samuilov. The opening track, "Highway Star", features rock musician and radio host Vladimir Janković "Džet" announcing the band. Janković also appears on vocals on the track "Black Night". Dragoljub "Paja" Bogdanović—who appeared as a guest on the band's debut album, Discover, and would become the band's frontman in 2015—appears on vocals on the track "Strange Kind of Woman". Bogdanović also designed the album cover.

Track listing

Disc 1

Disc 2

Personnel
Vladimir Jezdimirović - vocals
Stevan Birak - guitar
Miodrag Krudulj - bass guitar
Dušan Gnjidić - drums
Zoran Samuilov - keyboard

Additional personnel
Vladimir Janković "Džet" - vocals (on track 5), announcement (on track 1)
Dragoljub "Paja" Bogdanović - vocals (on track 9), cover design
Moma Cvetković - sound engineer, recorded by
Zoltan Totka - photography

References

Deep Purple Tribute at Discogs

External links
Deep Purple Tribute at Discogs

Cactus Jack (band) live albums
2003 live albums
One Records (Serbia) live albums
Deep Purple tribute albums